Lào Cai is a city in the Northwest region of Vietnam. It is the capital of Lào Cai Province. The city borders Bảo Thắng District, Bát Xát District, Sa Pa and the city of Hekou Yao Autonomous County, in Yunnan province of southwest China. It lies at the junction of the Red River (Sông Hồng) and the Nanxi River (Yunnan) approximately 160 miles (260 km) northwest of Hanoi.

It is a market town for timber, and the Lào Cai Railway Station is located on the Hải Phòng railway to Yunnan Province in China.

History
The town was invaded by China in 1979 and the border was closed until 1993. The town has a carbide factory.

Climate
Lào Cai has a dry-winter humid subtropical climate (Köppen Cwa), similar to most of Northern Vietnam.

Topography and geology
The city has diverse topographical and geological features, including hill, mountainous, half mountainous, coastal plains and coastal sand dunes.

The hilly region is in the west, stretching from north to south (in parts of communes: Dong Son, Thuan Duc) with an average elevation of 12–15 m, with total area of 64.93 km2, 41.7% of the city total area. Residents here live on agriculture, forestry, farming. The soil in this area is poor in nutrition, infertile and subject to continuous erosion due to its slope of 7-10%.

The half hilly region surrounds a plain with an average elevation of 10 m from north-east - north to north-west – south-west and south – south-east. This region covers commues and wards of Bắc Lý, Nam Lý, Nghĩa Ninh, Bắc Nghĩa, Đức Ninh, Đức Ninh Đông, Lộc Ninh and Phú Hải with total area of 62.87 km2, or accounts for 40.2% of the city total area. Residents here lives on industrial, handcraft, trading and a small percentage lives on farming. This region is not very fertile, subject to alum. However, thanks to the heavy distribution of rivers and lakes, ponds and pools, it's better for agriculture than the hilly region. The plain with the average of 2.1 m, with little slope, accounting for 0.2% of the city area (5.76 km2). Most of the city's commercial, administrative and main streets concentrate in this narrow regions. Coastal sand dune area is on the east of the city, with an area of 21.98 km2, making up 14,3% of the total area.

Demographics
As of 2020 the city had a population of 130,671, covering an area of 282.13 km2.

Ethnic minorities in Lào Cai used to speak Southwestern Mandarin and Vietnamese to each other when their languages were not mutually intelligible.

Administrative divisions
Lào Cai City is officially divided into 17 commune-level sub-divisions, including 10 wards (Bắc Cường, Bắc Lệnh, Bình Minh, Cốc Lếu, Duyên Hải, Kim Tân, Lào Cai, Nam Cường, Pom Hán, and Xuân Tăng) and 7 rural communes (Cam Đường, Cốc San, Đồng Tuyển, Hợp Thành, Tả Phời, Thống Nhất, Vạn Hòa).

References

External links
 

Populated places in Lào Cai province
Provincial capitals in Vietnam
Districts of Lào Cai province
Cities in Vietnam
China–Vietnam border crossings
Lào Cai province